New Wine in Old Bottles is an album by saxophonist Jackie McLean with the Great Jazz Trio; pianist Hank Jones, bassist Ron Carter and drummer Tony Williams, recorded in 1978 for the Japanese East Wind label.

Reception

Reviewing in Christgau's Record Guide: Rock Albums of the Seventies (1981), Robert Christgau called New Wine in Old Bottles "the best McLean album in over a decade" and said, "the saxophonist's work here surpasses that on his European SteepleChase outings because the rhythm section of Hank Jones, Ron Carter, and Tony Williams encourages him to think as fast as he can play, which is plenty fast." AllMusic awarded the album 4½ stars stating "It was an inspired idea to match alto saxophonist Jackie McLean with the Great Jazz Trio, a regularly working unit on record and in concert led by the outstanding pianist Hank Jones, joined by two first call players, bassist Ron Carter and drummer Tony Williams. ...Jones' advanced playing may be a eye-opener for some fans who do not realize how advanced and wide ranging a pianist he is".

Track listing
All Compositions by Jackie McLean except as indicated
 "Appointment in Ghana Again" - 5:50
 "It Never Entered My Mind" (Richard Rodgers, Lorenz Hart) - 6:42
 "'Round About Midnight" (Monk, Cootie Williams, Bernie Hanighen) - 9:07
 "Little Melonae Again" - 5:54
 "Bein' Green" (Joe Raposo) - 6:25
 "Confirmation" (Charlie Parker) - 6:19

Personnel 
Jackie McLean - alto saxophone
Hank Jones - piano
Ron Carter - bass
Tony Williams - drums

References 

1978 albums
Jackie McLean albums
Great Jazz Trio albums
East Wind Records albums